Brockton High School, established in 1870, is a high school located in Brockton, Massachusetts. It is a part of Brockton Public Schools. As of 2016 Brockton High School, with 4,029 students, is one of the largest high schools in the United States and the largest high school in Massachusetts. Brockton High School's colors are Black & Red and their mascot is the Boxers, which is a reference to the storied boxing history of the city, and also a tribute to hall-of-fame boxers Rocky Marciano and Marvin Hagler, who are both from Brockton and alumni of Brockton High School.

History
When Brockton High was founded, it could house only 125 students. As the population of Brockton grew, there was increasing demand for a larger building. In 1906, a new high school was constructed, consisting of an "A" building and a "B" building. By the 1960s, student numbers exceeded capacity, causing split sessions; upperclassmen and sophomores attended school at different times of the day. The sophomores attended in the afternoon while the upperclassmen took their classes in the morning. In 1965, the City Council Finance Committee approved an $8 million proposal to construct a new high school to accommodate the swelling student body. In 1965, the ground for the new building was broken and in 1970, the school was complete. The "A" building has since been torn down, and the "B" building housed a pre-K center and then charter and alternative school programs, and is slated to be torn down in spring 2023 to make way for a new public safety center. The current high school campus comprises nine buildings and is approximately the size of an aircraft carrier (1/3 mile long) and has  of floor space, about half the size of the Prudential Center in Boston. At one time, the highest number of students housed in the school was 4,250.

Nahyo M. Kim of The New York Times wrote that in a period around 10 years before 2010, Brockton High "was a case study in failure". At that time the school's unofficial motto was "students have a right to fail if they want". Around 1999 the school set up a reform plan, using the skill areas of reading, reasoning, speaking, and writing and using them in the school's curriculum. By 2001 student performance improved. Susan Szachowicz, the former principal, said that the school culture and large size was crucial to the school's turnaround. This occurred in a period when education advocates promoted small schools.

Campus
Brockton High School is set on a small urban campus comprising eight buildings including four main student academic buildings divided by colors (Green, Red, Azure, Yellow) a core connecting them all and a gym and fine arts building. The campus also features a turf football stadium, ice skating rink, 25-yard swimming pool, 1608-seat capacity auditorium, and four cafeterias in the respective buildings.

The current Brockton High School campus was advanced for its time when it first opened in 1970, for it featured a modern greenhouse, a modern public address system, and a high-tech TV studio (redone in 2003.) There are currently plans underway for an expansion and renovation of the school, which would include a new state-of-the-art STEM building.

Academics
In 1999, 75% of its students failed Massachusetts Comprehensive Assessment System (MCAS) mathematics examinations and 44% failed MCAS English examinations. Around that period, about 1/3 of students of each Brockton class dropped out. By 2001, student performance improved. Between 2000 and 2001, more students went from failing to passing at Brockton High than at any other school in Massachusetts.

In 2005, 98% of the senior class (850 students) graduated. In 2008 78% of the graduating senior class planned to pursue a college degree. In 2006, Brockton High School was a recipient of the National School Change Award. Brockton High School was one of 7 schools in the United States to receive this award. Out of the seven schools, there were only two high schools.

In 2008, Brockton students had a higher level of improvement on the English MCAS than 90% of the Massachusetts high schools. By 2010 it was one of the highest performing schools on the MCAS.

Demographics
As of 2021-22, the school has approximately 3,943 students. 

Enrollment by Race/Ethnicity (2021-22)
61.9% African American
14.4% White
2.4% Asian
16.9% Hispanic
4.2% Multi-Race, Non-Hispanic
.3% Native Hawaiian/Pacific Islander
0.1% Native American

Athletics

Football

Since the football teams' inaugural season in 1897, they have achieved 17 undefeated seasons, as well as achieving 15 one-loss seasons.
Since 1972, the football team has made 17 appearances in the MIAA Division 1 State Championship game, winning it 11 times. (1972, 1973, 1984, 1985, 1987, 1988, 1991, 1992, 1996, 2004, 2005). 
The Boxers have also won 1 MSSPA State Championship (1948), and 2 MIAC State Championships (1960, 1970); bringing their total number of state championships to 14.
In 1948, the Boxers played in a post-season game against Miami Edison Senior High School, winning 34–0. 
From 1979–1992, Brockton was one of the most dominant high school football teams in the country. During this 14-year period, the Boxers' won 6 state championships, won 11 league championships, had 3 undefeated seasons, and had 8 one-loss seasons. The Boxers' record during this period was 118-14-0. They are regarded as one of the greatest high school football programs of the 1980s.

Football accomplishments
 National Championships (1) - 1948
 State Championships (14) - 1948, 1960, 1970, 1972, 1973, 1984, 1985, 1987, 1988, 1991, 1992, 1996, 2004, 2005
 State Finalists (11) - 1950, 1958, 1959, 1979, 1980, 1981, 1989, 1998, 2006, 2008, 2012
 Undefeated seasons (17) - 1899, 1900, 1924, 1932, 1936, 1937, 1939, 1945, 1958, 1959, 1970, 1972, 1973, 1984, 1985, 1987, 2005
 One-loss seasons (15) - 1897, 1918, 1921, 1930, 1938, 1948, 1960, 1979, 1980, 1982, 1986, 1988, 1989, 1990, 1992

Notable accomplishments
The football team has made USA Today's Top 25 list a total of 4 times. In 1984 (#7), 1985 (#9), 1987 (#5), and 1988 (#17).
Over 20 players from Brockton have played in the NFL, including Ken MacAfee, Greg McMurtry, Rudy Harris and Al Louis-Jean.
Brockton has the 14th-most wins of any high school football program in the country.

Armond Colombo, who coached at Brockton for 34 years (1969–2002), has the second-most wins of a head coach in Massachusetts history, behind only Ken LaChapelle of Northbridge High School. Colombo retired as head coach in 2002 with an overall record of 316-100-5. Before Colombo arrived in Brockton in 1969, he was the head coach at nearby Archbishop Williams High School from 1955–1968. At the school, he led the Bishops to five catholic Conference titles and three Massachusetts Class D State Championships. Colombo amassed 96 wins as the head coach of Archbishop Williams, and 220 wins as the head coach of Brockton.

Other sports
The school's mascot is the Boxer. The actual mascot is a dog, but the name is a pun in reference to Rocky Marciano and Marvin Hagler, two famous boxers from Brockton. The stadium in which the Boxers' football, field hockey, soccer and outdoor track teams compete is named Rocky Marciano Stadium in honor of the legendary boxer. With a capacity of approximately 10,000 people, Marciano Stadium is one of the largest high school stadiums in Massachusetts and is one of the premier facilities in the state as well. The stadium also plays host to numerous Massachusetts high school football state playoff games, including the sectional and regional finals.

The BHS baseball team plays at Campanelli Stadium, constructed in 2002, which also plays host to the amateur baseball team, the Brockton Rox, of the Futures Collegiate Baseball League.

In 2012, a nearly 30-foot tall bronze statue of Rocky Marciano was erected outside the north end of the stadium as a tribute to the boxer.

Notable Alumni/ae

Claire D. Cronin - United States Ambassador to Ireland
Kristian Alfonso - Actress
Gerry Cassidy, member of the Massachusetts House of Representatives and former political aide
Keith Davidson – former lawyer for Stormy Daniels
Kenneth Feinberg - Special Master of the September 11th Victim Compensation Fund
Mike Gordon - Former MLB player (Chicago Cubs)
Marvin Hagler - Middleweight boxing championsc
Mark Hartsell - American football quarterback, played for Boston College, and professionally for the Chicago Bears and Scottish Claymores of the NFL and NFL Europe
Pooch Hall - Actor
Rudy Harris - NFL football player, attended Clemson, played for the Tampa Bay Buccaneers
James Kelleher - Musician, Jimmy Luxury and the Tommy Rome Orchestra. Songs appeared in the movies "Go" and "Oceans Eleven"
John Kiely - Former MLB player (Detroit Tigers)
Al Louis-Jean - NFL player
Ken MacAfee - NFL football player, attended Notre Dame, played for the San Francisco 49ers
Rocky Marciano - Heavyweight boxing champion
Brian McFadden - Cartoonist for The New York Times, Big Fat Whale
Greg McMurtry - NFL football player, attended Michigan, played for the Chicago Bears & New England Patriots
Freddie Moncewicz - Former MLB player (Boston Red Sox)
 Lynda Newton - professional wrestler
Eric Rubin, MD, PhD - microbiologist, Editor-in-chief of the New England Journal of Medicine
Wally Snell - Former MLB player (Boston Red Sox)
Walt Uzdavinis - American football player
Herbert Warren Wind - Author
Dave Wedge - Author

References

Further reading
Bloom, Alex. "New principal looks to build on success of Brockton High." Enterprise News. July 9, 2013.

External links

 Brockton High School
 History of Brockton Public School

Buildings and structures in Brockton, Massachusetts
Schools in Plymouth County, Massachusetts
Public high schools in Massachusetts
1870 establishments in Massachusetts
Educational institutions established in 1870